The South Africa national cricket team toured Sri Lanka during the 2004 season, playing two Tests from 4 to 15 August 2004. South Africa was led by Graeme Smith while Sri Lanka was led by Marvan Atapattu. Sri Lanka won the Test series 1–0 with one match drawn.

Squads

Test series summary

1st Test

2nd Test

One Day Internationals (ODIs)

1st ODI

2nd ODI

3rd ODI

4th ODI

5th ODI

References

2004 in South African cricket
2004 in Sri Lankan cricket
2004
International cricket competitions in 2004
Sri Lankan cricket seasons from 2000–01